SM U-60 was a German Type UB III submarine of the Imperial German Navy in the First World War. She took part in the First Battle of the Atlantic.

U-60 was surrendered to the Allies at Harwich on 21 November 1918 in accordance with the requirements of the Armistice with Germany. She was sold by the British Admiralty to George Cohen on 3 March 1919 for £2,410, but sank in tow for Swansea after 12 June 1919.

Summary of raiding history

References

Notes

Citations

Bibliography

1916 ships
Ships built in Bremen (state)
Type U 57 submarines
U-boats commissioned in 1916
World War I submarines of Germany